Ramon Renaldo Martinez Gion (Born September 12, 1990 in Amsterdam) is a professional Dutch volleyball player, currently playing for Draisma Dynamo Volleyball.

Early life 

His parents are Gabriel Martinez Gion and Simone Seegers. He has played in the Netherlands, Belgium and German national competition, with some successes like winning the National Cup in the 2011-2012 season with Landstede Volleyball Netherlands A-League.

Career

Ramon has played for VC Omniworld, VVH, VC Allvo, Landstede Volleyball, Prefaxis Menen and Chemie Volley Mitteldeutschland volleyball clubs. He started playing volleyball at age 12 after a lesson at school. Ramon worked his way up to the highest leagues through athletic and dynamic volleyball practice. During his time at the professional level with the Landstede Volleyball Club Ramon has won 2 national titles, 2 super cup titles, and 2 national cup titles. He was also voted as best player in season 2013/2014. Ramon is selected on the national long list of Holland existing out of 22 players.

National Prizes 
 2011/2012  Dutch National Cup, with Landstede Volleybal
 2012/2013  Dutch Supercup, with Landstede Volleybal
 2012/2013  Dutch Championship, with Landstede Volleybal
 2013/2014  Dutch Supercup, with Landstede Volleybal
 2013/2014  Dutch National Cup, with Landstede Volleybal
 2013/2014  Dutch Championship, with Landstede Volleybal
 2013/2014  Almelo International Tournament, with Landstede Volleybal
 2013/2014  Team Of The Year, with Landstede Volleybal
 2017/2018  Greek Super Cup, with P.A.O.K. Volley
 2017/2018  Greek National Cup, with P.A.O.K. Volley
 2017/2018  Greek National Championship, with P.A.O.K. Volley
 2019/2020  German Cup, with RTV Rottenburg

Individual Prizes 
 1x  Match MVP Bundesliga Germany
 5x  Match MVP Bundesliga Germany
       2012/2013 Finals Top Scorer, with Landstede Volleybal
       2013/2014 Player Of The Year, with Landstede Volleybal
       2017/2018 P.A.O.K. Top scorer of the regular season

Personal life
At the beginning of Ramon’s professional career he already stated his sexuality and did various interviews for dutch media representing the LGBTQ community giving it a voice in the world of professional sports. On national coming out day (11 October 2012) Ramon helped by raising the rainbow flag over the city hall of Zwolle. While being the first openly homosexual volleyball player in The Netherlands he continued representing LGBTQ in his international career. Resulting in being the first openly gay professional athlete in Belgium France and Greece. Ramon was nominated for the OUT d’or in 2019 and to be ambassador of the 15th Paris International Sports Tournament hosted by FSGL.

References
 Ramon Martinez Gion

Sources 
 Bundesliga Volleyball
 CV Mitteldeutschland
 Volley Menen
 Landstede Volleyball
 Volleybalkrant

External links 
 Volley Menen
 Landstede Volleyball

1990 births
Living people
Dutch men's volleyball players
Dutch expatriate sportspeople in Belgium
Sportspeople from Amsterdam
PAOK V.C. players